Bhupinder Singh  (born 1 April 1965 in Punjab, India) is a former Indian cricketer. He played domestic cricket for Punjab and played two One Day Internationals for India in 1994.

Bhupinder Singh was a member of selection committee, a post to which he was nominated in 2005, and which he retained in 2006.

Bhupinder Singh is also an administrator in the Punjab Cricket Association.

References

Punjab, India cricketers
Indian cricketers
India One Day International cricketers
North Zone cricketers
Indian cricket administrators
1965 births
Living people
India national cricket team selectors
Indian cricket coaches
Guru Gobind Singh Sports College, Lucknow alumni